The third season of Knight Rider, an American television series, began September 30, 1984, and ended on May 5, 1985. It aired on NBC. The region 1 DVD was released on January 31, 2006.

KITT's dashboard was redesigned, and he gained some new abilities. Patricia McPherson returned as Bonnie Barstow, and would remain until the end of the series. 

Michael and Devon had also become close friends as well as associates by this point, trusting one another enough to work and conspire in secret together without notifying KITT or Bonnie ("Knight in Disgrace"). 

KITT's renegade prototype KARR resurfaced in the episode "K.I.T.T. vs. K.A.R.R". A new voice actor, Paul Frees, replaced KARR's original voice actor, Peter Cullen.

Cast
 David Hasselhoff as Michael Knight
 William Daniels as the voice of KITT (Knight Industries Two Thousand) (uncredited) 
 Edward Mulhare as Devon Miles
 Patricia McPherson as Dr. Bonnie Barstow
 Richard Basehart as the voice of Wilton Knight
 Paul Frees as the voice of KARR (Knight Automated Roving Robot) (uncredited).

Episodes

References

External links 
 
 

 
1984 American television seasons
1985 American television seasons
Knight Rider (1982 TV series) seasons